Leucopogon multiflorus is a species of flowering plant in the family Ericaceae and is endemic to the southwest of Western Australia. It is a rigid shrub with crowded, sharply-pointed, linear to lance-shaped leaves, and white, tube-shaped flowers usually in groups in leaf axils.

Description
Leucopogon multiflorus is a stout, rigid shrub with sotly-hairy branches. The flowers are arranged in leaf axils in groups of 3, 4 or more on a short peduncle with bracts and bracteoles less than half as long as the sepals.

Taxonomy
Leucopogon multiflorus was first formally described in 1810 by Robert Brown in his Prodromus Florae Novae Hollandiae et Insulae Van Diemen. The specific epithet (multiflorus) means "many-flowered".

Distribution
This leucopogon occurs in the Esperance Plains bioregion of south-western Western Australia.

Conservation status
Leucopogon multiflorus is listed as "Priority One" by the Government of Western Australia Department of Biodiversity, Conservation and Attractions, meaning that it is known from only one or a few locations which are potentially at risk.

References

multiflorus
Ericales of Australia
Flora of Western Australia
Plants described in 1810
Taxa named by Robert Brown (botanist, born 1773)